Ethiopian Airlines (commonly referred to as Ethiopian), formerly Ethiopian Air Lines (EAL), is the flag carrier of Ethiopia, and is wholly owned by the country's government. EAL was founded on 21 December 1945 and commenced operations on 8 April 1946, expanding to international flights in 1951. The firm became a share company in 1965 and changed its name from Ethiopian Air Lines to Ethiopian Airlines.

The airline has been a member of the International Air Transport Association since 1959 and of the African Airlines Association (AFRAA) since 1968. The company slogan is 'The New Spirit of Africa.' Ethiopian's hub and headquarters are at Bole International Airport in Addis Ababa, from where it serves a network of 125 passenger destinations—20 of them domestic—and 44 freighter destinations. The airline has secondary hubs in Togo and Malawi. Ethiopian is Africa's largest airline in terms of passengers carried, destinations served, fleet size, and revenue. Ethiopian is also the world's fourth-largest airline by the number of countries served.

History

The 1940s: early years
After the liberation of Ethiopia, Emperor Haile Selassie I asked the United States, the United Kingdom, and France to help him to establish an airline as part of his modernization effort. According to the BBC News it is possible that the Emperor intended the creation of a quality national airline to help dispel impressions of Ethiopian poverty. In 1945, the Ethiopian government began negotiations with both Transcontinental Air Transport and Western Air Express (later merged into TWA). On 8 September 1945, TWA signed an agreement with the American historian and foreign affairs advisor to Ethiopia John H. Spencer to establish a commercial aviation company in Ethiopia.

The carrier, originally called Ethiopian Air Lines (EAL), was founded on 21 December 1945, with an initial investment of ETB 2,5 million, divided in 25,000 shares that were entirely held by the government. The company was financed by the Ethiopian government but managed by TWA. At the beginning, it relied upon American pilots, technicians, administrators and accountants; even its General Managers were from TWA. Minister of Works and Communications Fitawrari Tafasse Habte Mikael became EAL first president and chairman, whereas H. H. Holloway —who was American— was appointed by TWA as general manager.

This route later operated on a weekly basis. The Skytrains were initially intended for military use, although Ethiopian operated them in a mixed passenger-cargo configuration. Soon afterwards, the carrier launched services to Aden and Djibouti, as well as a domestic flight to Jimma. The main five routes in the early years were Addis Ababa–Asmara, Addis Ababa–Djibouti–Aden, Addis Ababa–Khartoum, Addis Ababa–Cairo (routed via Jeddah or Khartoum) and Asmara–Khartoum.

In July the same year, four more Skytrains joined the fleet. In 1947, Waldon Gene Golien became the general manager, and the company started operating charter flights to Jeddah during the Hajj season. That year in February, three more Douglas C-47s were acquired to operate new international routes. In September, Port Sudan was added to the route network (it was previously a technical stop en route to Cairo), Lydda was incorporated as a scheduled destination in October and charter flights to Bombay were launched in November. In September, the route to Bombay became a scheduled route, with EAL flying as far as Aden, and BOAC operating the Aden–Bombay sector. The route also included stops at Mesirah Island in Oman and Karachi. For a brief period until , Mesirah Island was used as a refuelling stop; since then, services to French Somaliland and Aden started on a twice-weekly basis. Aden was under British rule at the time as was Sudan, and the British Empire denied EAL landing rights at Khartoum, forcing the airline to move the refuelling stop on the Aden route to Port Sudan. The carrier recorded a £40,000 profit for 1949.

The 1950s: start of long-haul routes
Also this year, a  loan granted from the Ex-Im Bank enabled the carrier to incorporate Convair CV-240s, aimed at operating international routes. Services to India and Sharjah were discontinued in 1953. On 14 July, a new agreement with TWA that succeeded the original one was signed. Unlike other companies, the airline's preamble stated that it was "the ultimate aim that EAL shall eventually be operated entirely by Ethiopian personnel".

These aircraft were equipped with rocket-assisted take-off devices. Also in 1955, Ethiopian inaugurated a self-owned maintenance facility. That year, Vic Harrell succeeded Swede Golien as general manager of the company. The carrier was in need of newer and larger aircraft, and three different aircraft types —two from the Lockheed Corporation, the Constellation and the Electra, and the Douglas DC-6— were considered for the fleet renewal programme. Two Douglas DC-6Bs were eventually ordered in 1956 for  million, including spares; an option for a third machine was also taken. Another loan obtained from the Ex-Im Bank, a  million one dating back to 1955, was partly used to finance the two purchased aircraft.

In 1957, a third DC-6B was purchased. Likewise, that year the airline had been asked to take a Lockheed L-749 that had been given as a gift to the Emperor, who declined it. Ethiopian paid  million for this airframe, and it was incorporated into the fleet on 4 June; the aircraft was destroyed by fire on 10 Jul in an accident in Sudan. On , flights to Wadi Halfa were terminated. The incorporation of three Douglas DC-6Bs took place between May and July, and EAL started a new link between Addis Ababa and Athens, via Cairo, using these recently delivered aircraft. On 21 Jun, the route was extended both to the north and to the south so that Frankfurt and Nairobi became linked by the same corridor, operated with DC-6Bs. By this time, the Convairs were redeployed to serve domestic and regional routes. Given that radio operators were no longer required as part of flight crews, they were assigned other tasks with the airline. Swissair handled the pilot training for the DC-6B aircraft at Zurich. The suspension of fifth freedom rights between Djibouti and Aden prompted the discontinuance of the route that linked them.

The 1960s and 1970s: the jet age

The airline had its first fatal accident on 15 July when a DC-3 crashed en route from Bulchi to Jimma, killing the pilot. A Convair 240 was sold to Allied Stores of Israel on 18 July. On 12 August, an order with Boeing for two Boeing 720B aircraft was placed. EAL general manager had already brought the idea of acquiring two jet aircraft for long-haul operations up already in February, suggesting the Boeing 720B. The Sud SE-210 Caravelle, the de Havilland D.H.106 Comet 4 and the Boeing 720B were all taken into account. Hot and high condition of some EAL operations made the Caravelle inappropriate, whereas the Comet was considered obsolete. The first east–west link made by an African airline started on 8 November,  when the Addis Ababa–Accra–Lagos–Monrovia route was launched using DC-6B equipment.

The second fatal accident took place on 5 September 1961 when another DC-3 crashed shortly after takeoff from Sendafar; a flight attendant and four passengers lost their lives in the accident. The event urged the Civil Aviation Department to investigate the accidents. It was found that the lack of infrastructure at many airfields, marginal even for DC-3 operations, was a major contribution. Landing sites at Gore, Mizan Teferi and Tippi were included in the list of airfields that would require closure. On 13 January 1962, the crew and  passengers lost their lives in another accident involving a DC-3 ET-T-1, EAL first aircraft of the type—this time the crash taking place at Tippi while the aircraft was taking off. The event prompted the government to decide to close the airfields at both Mizan Teferi and Tippi. In ,  more DC-3s were acquired, and registered ET-ABE and ET-ABF. During the year, the "ET-T-" registration would change to simply "ET-".

It was also decided to build a new airport to replace the Lideta Airfield, which was unable to accommodate the Boeing 720 jetliner the company intended to acquire. This was the birth of Bole International Airport, where the company set its headquarters. 

In , the arrival of  Boeing 720s ordered directly from Boeing marked the carrier entrance into the jet age. These two aircraft were registered ET-AAG and ET-AAH and were named the "Blue Nile" and "White Nile", respectively. The first jet service took place on  when one of these aircraft was deployed on the route to Nairobi. The following day, a new service to Madrid was flown using the new jet equipment, with Frankfurt joining the jet network soon afterward. On 1 April, the Boeing 720 replaced the DC-6B on the Addis Ababa–Athens route; during that month, the West African corridor also benefited from jet operations. The airline entered into a pool agreement with Aden Airways and Sudan Airways on the Khartoum–Asmara–Aden service. Kano, which had been served since , was removed from the list of destinations that day. On 30 November 1963, the airline lost another DC-3 (ET-AAT) in a test flight at Addis Ababa; the crew of  suffered minor injuries.

Also in the early 1960s, the carrier provided some initial aviation support to the Ethiopia-United States Mapping Mission in its operation to acquire topographic maps of Ethiopia. The firm changed from a corporation to a share company in 1965 and changed its name from Ethiopian Air Lines to Ethiopian Airlines. 

By 1966, the contractual relationship with TWA was adjusted to reflect the transfer of management with the appointment of an Ethiopian deputy general manager, and Col. Semret Medhane was appointed to the post.

In 1970, the fifth renewal of the original 1945 contract changed TWA's role from manager to adviser. On its 25th anniversary in 1971, the company was ready to continue without foreign assistance. Since then, Ethiopian Airlines has been managed and staffed by Ethiopian personnel. The first Ethiopian General Manager was Col. Semret Medhane, appointed in 1971. Two Boeing 720Bs were acquired from Continental Airlines in 1973. In 1975, the carrier ordered five Dash 7s. By then, Ethiopian Airlines had ended its 30-year relationship with TWA. The airline became a new customer for the Boeing 727 in 1978, ordering two. The 727s arrived in the late 1970s as a replacement for the oldest Boeing 720s.

The 1980s and 1990s

The DHC-5 Buffalo entered Ethiopian's fleet in the early 1980s. In 1982, Ethiopian became the first African carrier in ordering the Boeing 767, as well as the first airline to order the Boeing 767-200ER. On 1984-6-1, the first of these aircraft set a new distance record for a twinjet, flying  non-stop from Washington, D.C. to Addis Ababa, on delivery to the company. The  came to replace the remaining Boeing 720s. ATR 42s and Twin Otters were incorporated into the fleet in the mid-1980s, with the first of six Twin Otters entering the fleet in early 1985. The Boeing 737-200 joined the fleet in late 1987.

In 1990, Ethiopian became the first passenger airline in taking delivery of the Boeing 757 Freighter, receiving the first of five  a year later. By 1996 the airline was flying to Bangkok, Beijing, Durban and Johannesburg; routes to Ivory Coast and Senegal were also being operated. Furthermore, the Fokker 50 entered the fleet to operate domestic routes; actually, Ethiopian became the last company in taking delivery of this aircraft in 1997, just after the collapse of Fokker due to financial problems. In the late 1990s the carrier saw the incorporation of Copenhagen and Maputo to its international network, as well as New York City and Washington as transatlantic destinations; the frequent flyer programme, named "Sheba Miles" after the legendary Queen of Sheba, was launched too. In 1998, the airline disrupted their flights to the Eritrean capital Asmara after a war erupted between the two countries.

2000present

A fleet renewal started in the early 2000s, with the incorporation of the Boeing 737-700 and the Boeing 767-300ER; The airline discontinued its service to Newark in favour of serving Washington in 2004. In the late 2000s the airline announced it would be the launch customer of the Boeing 787 Dreamliner, and placed orders to acquire brand new Airbus A350-900s, Boeing 777-200LRs and Bombardier equipment.

In late , Ethiopian Airlines was officially invited to join Star Alliance under the mentoring of Lufthansa.

Corporate affairs

Management and ownership
The current CEO is Mesfin Tassew, who was appointed by the airline's board of directors on 24 March 2022. Mesfin is working at Ethiopian Airlines since 1984. He also was the CEO of Asky Airlines, a strategic partner of Ethiopian Airlines. Prior to that, Tewolde Gebremariam has been serving as the airline's Group CEO from 2011 until his resignation on March 2022. The airline, which is wholly owned by the Government of Ethiopia, has traditionally been unfettered by government intervention, even during times of significant turmoil and domestic hardship. Whereas many African state-owned airlines were and remain often poorly run, with staffings often serving nepotistic purposes, and business decisions being made on political grounds, Ethiopian Airlines remained professionally run and managed, leading The Christian Science Monitor to term it in 1988 a "capitalist success in Marxist Ethiopia".

The Derg, after expanding the airline's workforce, which had resulted in a decline in service quality and revenues, allowed the airline to be run on a "strictly commercial basis". Captain Mohammed Ahmed was appointed CEO in 1980 and slashed the workforce by 10%. The airline continued the acquisition of Western, rather than Soviet aircraft, despite the links between the communist government and the Soviet Union, purchasing the Boeing 727 in 1979 and the Boeing 767 in 1984. Despite famine, unfavorable exchange rates, and general economic disarray, the airline managed to retain its reputation, particularly in the provision of maintenance and training. The Financial Times noted that it managed to remain one of the most profitable airlines in Africa throughout the decade.

Despite the violent overthrow of the communist government by the Ethiopian People's Revolutionary Democratic Front in 1991, the airline managed to post a profit for the fiscal year. In 1994, 40 top executives including the general manager Capt. Zelleke Demissie were fired after they signed a letter rebuking a government report, and a new general manager from outside the industry, Dr. Ahmed Kellow, was appointed.
The airline would regain operational independence when longtime company veteran Bisrat Nigatu was appointed to the top post in 1997, and remained fiscally sound, despite disruptions caused by the Eritrean-Ethiopian War.

In 2018 it was announced that the Ethiopian government would partially or wholly privatize several state-owned enterprises, amongst them Ethiopian Airlines, although it would retain a majority stake in key firms, including the airline. In October 2020, the Ministry of Finance postponed the planned privatization of the state owned airline.

Organization
The Ethiopian government reorganized the airline as a fully owned aviation holding group in July 2017. The aim was to maximize efficiency, enhance customer service to a global standard, and ease of longterm planning. The initial group consisted of: The Ethiopian Airports Enterprise (EAE), the Passenger Airline company, Cargo Airline, and Logistics Company, Ethiopian Aviation Academy, Ethiopian In-flight Catering Services, Ethiopian MRO Services, and Ethiopian Hotel and Tourism Services. The MRO Services is the largest such operation serving the continent and the Med-Eastern region; fully accredited by FAA and EASA. The Cargo and Logistical division are expanding to increase annual capacity to 1.5 million tons.

Head office

Ethiopian Airlines currently has its head office at Bole International Airport, Addis Ababa, but intends to build a new head office facility. A contest for the design was held in 2009, but none of those plans were proceeded with. On 16 February 2011, it held a second round, and in September 2011 it was announced that BET Architect Plc won the contest. The airline stated that the estimated Br300 million complex will be constructed on a  plot at Bole International Airport. The company that received 4th place in the competition's second round has threatened to take legal action, accusing the airline of not giving due consideration to the proposed design.

Business trends
Performance figures for the government-owned Ethiopian Airlines are available in their Annual Reports and occasional press reports. Available recent trends are (as at year ending 30 June):

Strategic ambitions and landmarks
The airline was featured by The Economist as an example of excellence in late 1987, and economist Paul B. Henze recognised it in 2000 as being "one of the most reliable and profitable airlines in the Third World". In , Ethiopian was named Africa's most profitable airline for the year 2010 by Air Transport World, and it has also been praised by AFRAA for its sustained profitability over recent years.

As a longterm company policy, in addition to the carrier's main activities, revenues are also generated by providing aircraft maintenance to foreign airlines, and specialist training for both Ethiopian and foreign trainees. Every year, pilots and technicians graduate from both the Pilot School, inaugurated in 1964, and the Aviation Maintenance Technician School, established in 1967. The American Federal Aviation Administration accredited the airline's maintenance division with licence No. ETIY 102F.

Ethiopian Airlines started "Vision 2010" in 2005, which aimed to increase passenger traffic to 3 million, revenue to  billion and employees to 6,000 by 2010. By 2010, Ethiopian had exceeded all goals set in "Vision 2010", and the company's net profit for the fiscal year ended 2010-6-30 was  million. The results were attributed in part to an aggressive marketing campaign and major cost-cutting measures.

"Vision 2025" also considers a fourfold expansion of the capacity building for trainees in the airline's aviation academy.

Ethiopian signed in  a deal for the acquisition of 49% of the Malawian carrier Air Malawi. The new airline will be named Malawian Airlines. The remaining shareholding will be held by the government of Malawi and private Malawian investors. For the operation year 2013–14, Ethiopian Airlines was ranked the most profitable airline in Africa and 18th most profitable airline in the world with a profit of $228 million.

In January 2018, Ethiopian signed a strategic partnership agreement with the Zambian government to assist in the relaunch of Zambia Airways. The airline has a 45% stake in the airline; the rest of the shares are held by the Zambian government. This move is aimed at developing Lusaka as an aviation hub for Southern Africa and fits with the airline's multiple hub strategy outlined in its 15-year Vision 2025 strategic plan.

In February 2018, Ethiopian and its Togo based regional airline partner ASKY Airlines formed a strategic partnership with the Guinean government to establish a startup carrier Guinea Airlines by June. This partnership is in line with the airline's 15-year Vision 2025 strategic plan to establish strategic partnerships with many African countries, enabling them to regain market share for travel. It is also in line with the recently launched African Single Air Transport Market.

Ethiopian Cargo and Logistical co. have formed a joint venture entity, yet unnamed, with DHL. The focus for the new company will be providing ground logistics to and from airports, seaports, and the rapidly expanding industrial parks of the region.

The business growth continued with an announcement, in April 2018, of a planned aerospace manufacturing facility. There is a small existing unit, under Ethiopian MRO Services, that manufactures wire-harnesses for the Boeing co. The new division, a joint venture with Aerosud of South Africa, will be capable of designing, and manufacturing, aircraft parts for plane makers. Negotiations are underway with Boeing, Honeywell, Airbus, and Bombardier Aerospace among others in search of clients. Accreditation will be sought from the FAA and EASA. The needed human resource will be groomed from the local technical schools and higher learning institutions. In July 2018 Ethiopian Airlines signed an agreement with German ACM Aerospace to set up a facility that will manufacture and supply aircraft seat covers, safety belts, carpets, and other interior parts.

Ethiopian Airlines launched a Mozambican subsidiary, Ethiopian Mozambique Airlines, in December 2018. The carrier competed with LAM Mozambique Airlines and Fastjet in the country's domestic market.

In January 2021, Ethiopian Airlines signed an interline agreement with South African carrier CemAir.

In May 2021, Ethiopian Mozambique Airlines ceased operations.

Destinations

, the carrier served 127 international, 22 domestic passenger destinations, and 58 cargo destinations. Ethiopian serves more destinations in Africa than any other airline. , the carrier's five densest routes were Addis Ababa–Dubai, Addis Ababa–Johannesburg, Addis Ababa–Guangzhou, Addis Ababa–Nairobi and Addis Ababa–Beijing.

In late , the airline said it planned to start serving the Latin American market but no firm dates were disclosed. In August that year, Abuja, Accra, Douala, Dubai, Entebbe, Frankfurt, Johannesburg, Harare, Kilimanjaro, Lagos, Lomé, London, Luanda, Lusaka, Malabo, Maputo, Mombasa, Mumbai, Nairobi and Rome would be served on an rotational basis with the first Boeing 787 Dreamliner, and that upon delivery of the second aircraft of the type these would be assigned on fixed scheduled routes.

Tokyo-Narita was added on 20 April 2015. Other new destinations are Los Angeles (the carrier  point to be served in the Americas) and Dublin.

Buenos Aires became the second stop for the airline in the continent starting on 8 March 2018 as an addition to the existing Addis Ababa-São Paulo run. The list of cargo destinations has grown with the recent addition of: Los Angeles, Mexico City, and three
additional cities in Africa. The daily uplift now stands at 650 tons. The plan, by 2025, is to grow the service points to 57 with a fleet of 18 aircraft, having the capacity to uplift 1.5 million tons annually.

Nosy-Be became the second stop, after Antananarivo, in Madagascar starting on 27 March 2018. The thrice-weekly service will be an outbound extension of the existing connection to the Comoros with a direct return to Addis Ababa. On the same day Kisangani and Mbuji Mayi, in the DRC, joined the Ethiopian network; bringing the total points served in Africa to 58.

As part of normalising relations between Ethiopia and Eritrea, the carrier restored service to the latter's capital Asmara on 18 July 2018.

Alliances and codeshare agreements

Alliances
In , Ethiopian Airlines' frequent flyer programme ShebaMiles and Lufthansa's Miles & More entered into partnership, allowing members of each programme to earn and spend miles on both airlines' networks. In , the carrier entered a strategic partnership with Lomé-based start-up airline ASKY Airlines, in which Ethiopian holds a 40% stake. Ethiopian Airlines is responsible for aircraft maintenance and operational management. The plan is to turn Lomé into Ethiopian Airline's regional hub for the West African market. ASKY started operations in January 2010 and became profitable after a few months.

Codeshare agreements
Ethiopian Airlines has codeshare agreements with the following airlines:

 Aegean Airlines
 Air Canada
 Air China
 Air Côte d'Ivoire
 Air Europa
 Air India
 All Nippon Airways
 Asiana Airlines
 ASKY Airlines
 Austrian Airlines
 Azul
 EgyptAir
 El Al
 Flynas
 ITA Airways
 Kuwait Airways
 LAM Mozambique Airlines
 Lufthansa
 Malawi Airlines
 Malaysia Airlines
 Oman Air
 RwandAir
 Scandinavian Airlines
 Shenzhen Airlines
 Singapore Airlines
 South African Airways
 SriLankan Airlines
 TAP Air Portugal
 Turkish Airlines
 United Airlines

Fleet

Recent developments
In , Ethiopian Airlines signed a preliminary agreement to buy up to ten Boeing 787 Dreamliners (five firm orders plus five options), becoming the first African carrier to order 787s. On , Boeing announced that Ethiopian had exercised its purchase rights and confirmed a firm order for ten aircraft. Ethiopian Airlines was also the first African airline to begin operating the Airbus A350 aircraft in 2016.

Services

Cloud Nine and Economy Class are the two classes available on most of Ethiopian Airlines' flights, but not on all-economy-layout Dash 8s.

Food and drinks
On all flights, passengers are provided with food and complimentary beverages onboard, in both classes. The food service consists of hot meals, hot or cold snacks, or light refreshments, depending on the length of the flight and the time of the day. The choice of acquiring special drinks at an extra cost is available too. The airline also offers assorted menus for passengers having special meal requirements.

In-flight entertainment

Cloud Nine
Ethiopian Airlines' Business Class is named Cloud Nine. Passengers travelling in this class are provided with onboard amenities and a wide variety of reading material. On routes operated with Boeing 777-200LR equipment passengers are provided with sleeper seats and on-demand audio and video services, with 85 channels on 15.4 inch IFE screens.

Economy Class
A variety of meals —ranging from light snacks to hot dishes— and amenities are provided to passengers flying on this class, both depending upon the length of the flight. Reclining seats and on-demand audio and video, with 80 channels and 8.9-inched screens, are available on Boeing 777-200LR services.

Lounges
Ethiopian Airlines passengers are offered two lounges at Bole International Airport. Cloud Nine passengers can wait for the departure of flights at the Cloud Nine Lounge, where they are provided with a wide variety of amenities, as well as personal computers or wireless connection. Likewise, ShebaMiles cardholders with Gold or Silver status can make use of the Sheba Miles Lounge facilities. Customer Service agents are available at both lounges in order to assist passengers with any query regarding their flights.

Accidents and incidents

According to the Aviation Safety Network records for Ethiopian Airlines, the airline has had 61 accidents and incidents since 1965, plus six more for Ethiopian Air Lines, the airline's former name. , these occurrences resulted in 494 deaths. On 10 March 2019, Ethiopian Airlines Flight 302, a 4-month-old Boeing 737 MAX 8 crashed shortly after takeoff from Addis Ababa en route to Nairobi, killing all 157 people on board from more than 30 different nations. Prior to the 2019 accident, a hijacking was the carrier's deadliest accident, when an aircraft crashed into the Indian Ocean due to fuel starvation in 1996. The third-deadliest accident occurred in 2010, when an aircraft crashed into the Mediterranean Sea shortly after it departed Beirut–Rafic Hariri International Airport, killing all 90 people on board. The crash of a Boeing 737-200 in 1988 led to 35 fatalities and is the fourth deadliest accident experienced by the company.

Controversies

Ethnic profiling allegations
In November and December 2020, Ethiopian Airlines was accused of banning or placing on leave those who are ethnic Tigrayans a minority, in relation to the Tigray War. The company denied the allegation, stating no employee was "suspended or terminated due to their ethnic background".  An article in The New York Times claimed the airlines' CEO, Tewolde Gebremariam, who is of Tigrayan origin, was also banned from leaving Ethiopia after the Tigray War started. Tewolde has been seen and interviewed at various international events since then.

CNN allegations of military activities
A CNN investigation alleged that Ethiopian Airlines Cargo airplanes transported weapons to airports in Eritrea during the Tigray War. The airline billed Ethiopia's Ministry of Defense at least six times in November 2020. The article's reporter claimed that using civil aircraft to "smuggle" military weapons violates international aviation law. However, CNN aviation analyst Mary Schiavo explained in a subsequent interview that it is not a violation of international law for commercial airlines to provide cargo services to governments in times of war. Ethiopian Airlines denied transporting weapons for the war and stated the goods transported were "food stuff and refill". On 7 October 2021, a since-deleted post on Ethiopian Airlines' Facebook page quoted the CEO as saying the airline had started an investigation of "treasonous" employees and that the airline "will continue fulfilling demands of the government. The airline later stated that the Facebook account was temporarily compromised and the posted statement was fake.

See also
 List of airlines of Ethiopia
 Transport in Ethiopia

Notes

References

Bibliography

External links

 
 Profile
 African Airlines Association
  

 
Airlines established in 1945
Airlines of Ethiopia
Government-owned airlines
1945 establishments in Ethiopia
Companies based in Addis Ababa
Government-owned companies of Ethiopia
Star Alliance